Brigadier-General Sir Berkeley Vincent,  (4 December 1871 – 29 January 1963) was a British Army officer and sportsman.

Military career
Born the son of Colonel Arthur Hare Vincent and Elizabeth Rose Manson and educated at Wellington College and the Royal Military Academy, Woolwich, Vincent was commissioned into the Royal Artillery as a second lieutenant on 24 July 1891. He was promoted to lieutenant on 24 July 1894 and to captain on 13 February 1900. He served with the China Expeditionary Force in late 1900 and then in the Second Boer War in South Africa. Following the end of the war, Vincent left Point Natal for India on the SS Ionian in October 1902 with other officers and men of the J Battery Royal Horse Artillery, and after arrival in Bombay, was stationed in Meerut, Bengal Presidency. In 1903, Vincent was sent to Tokyo to learn Japanese: he served as British military attaché with the Japanese Army during the Russo-Japanese War and, from 1 March 1904, was attached to the 2nd Division of the First Japanese Army in Manchuria.

Vincent was a protégé of Ian Hamilton, also an observer in the Russo-Japanese War. Vincent attended Staff College, Camberley. The then Commandant, Henry Wilson, was sceptical of Berkeley's claims that Japanese morale had enabled their infantry to overcome Russian defensive firepower. He was promoted to major in the 6th (Inniskilling) Dragoons in 1908. In 1911, when Vincent learned that he was to leave his job, and was shown General Haig's critical report on him, he availed himself of his right to Appeal to the King, under Section 42 of the Army Act, claiming unfair dismissal.

He served in World War I as a General Staff Officer at Headquarters Indian Corps and then transferred to the 37th Division. Appointed a Companion of the Order of St Michael and St George in 1916, he took part in the Battle of the Somme and the Battle of Ancre. Promoted to lieutenant-colonel in January 1917, he became Commander of the 35th Infantry Brigade. He took part in the Battle of Arras in April 1917, when he was buried alive, and the subsequent retreat, when he was gassed. He also took part in the attack on the Hindenburg Line.

After the war, he became commanding officer of the 6th (Inniskilling) Dragoons. He went on to be Commander of the British Forces in Iraq in 1922 and retired in 1924.

Honours
 Companion of the Order of St. Michael and St. George (CMG), 1916.
 Companion of the Order of the Bath (CB), 1919.
 Knight Commander of the Order of the British Empire (KBE), 1924.

See also
Military attachés and observers in the Russo-Japanese War

References

Sources
Burke, John and Bernard Burke. (1914).  Burke's genealogical and heraldic history of peerage, baronetage and knightage. London: Burke's Peerage Ltd. OCLC 2790692
Debrett, John, Charles Kidd, David Williamson. (1990).  Debrett's Peerage and Baronetage.  New York: Macmillan.

External links

1871 births
1963 deaths
British Army personnel of the Second Boer War
Graduates of the Royal Military Academy, Woolwich
Graduates of the Staff College, Camberley
British Army generals
People of the Russo-Japanese War
British Army cavalry generals of World War I
Companions of the Order of St Michael and St George
Knights Commander of the Order of the British Empire
Companions of the Order of the Bath
Royal Artillery officers
6th (Inniskilling) Dragoons officers